was a Japanese singer-songwriter born on Hashima Island, Nagasaki Prefecture. She first made her professional debut with the single, Kanashii Jiyū / Koi ga, Kiete Yuku. She is also known as the Shelby Flint of Japan.

Biography

Early life

Okazaki was born in Hashima Island, Nagasaki Prefecture on December 29, 1959. She was born left-handed. During her childhood, she was forced by her mother to use her right hand. However, after hearing that it was bad to force her to use her right hand, her mother quickly advised her to use her natural hand.  During her school days, she spent time in the bakery where she worked part-time, and practiced with her band, Eleanor. She was then in charge of the chorus and piano.

Career
Okazaki made her debut as a singer-songwriter in 1993. During the nineties, she continued singing and also wrote songs for various voice actors. As she became more involved with anime she composed songs for Wedding Peach, Fruits Basket, Princess Tutu, Symphonic Rain, Say "I love you.", and Love Hina. She formed the duo, Melocure in 2002 with singer-songwriter Megumi Hinata.

In the following two years, the duo released several singles and an album, Melodic Hard Cure. Okazaki also produced songs during these years for artists such as Megumi Hayashibara, Mayumi Iizuka, and Yui Horie. According to her fans, the lyrics of Okazaki's songs are characterized by poetic imagery, depth of emotion, gentle optimism and simplicity.

Death
She was diagnosed with stomach cancer in 2003 but still continued with her work. During this time there was little information released about her. The news was revealed to the public in the liner notes of the CD soundtrack re-release of the visual novel Symphonic Rain, which was released a year after her death.

On May 5, 2004, Okazaki died suddenly at the age of 44 from septic shock as a result of sepsis. She was unable to speak any last words, and left her work unfinished.

Discography

Singles

Albums

Source:

See also
Music of Fruits Basket

References

External links

 Okazaki Ritsuko's official homepage 
 Official site @ Star Child 
 Official site @ Universal Music  
 Ritsuko Okazaki @ King Records  
 Memorial page @ CDJapan

Anime musicians
1959 births
2004 deaths
Japanese women singer-songwriters
Japanese women pop singers
Deaths from sepsis
Musicians from Nagasaki Prefecture
20th-century Japanese musicians
20th-century Japanese women singers
20th-century Japanese singers
21st-century Japanese women singers
21st-century Japanese singers